Dracula velutina is a species of orchid.

velutina